Darbuka Siva is a director, writer, musician, music producer, actor and a football enthusiast based in Chennai, India. Starting out as a drummer/percussionist, he went on to acting, writing and directing films which have won awards in film festivals in Europe and London.

Early life
Siva grew in the suburbs of what was then North Madras. Siva was aware of his music calling early on during schooling, but was not able to do much because of the middle-class situation at home. But soon, Siva started learning and playing music on his own interest.

Career

Music 
In 1999, he managed to buy a basic drum kit and began playing on his own. From there on, it was a classic case of one thing leading to another. Siva started his performing career in 2000 with 'Oikyotaan', an experimental Bengali Baul music band led by Bonnie Chakraborty, who was also Siva's musical mentor. This experience pretty much shaped up Siva's musical approach and also had a major influence on many of his future projects. In 2002, during his final year in college Siva had to bunk all of his final year's exams to make himself available for an Oikyotaan tour. That marked the end of his academic duties.

Siva initially started out as a drummer, but soon he found himself hooked towards hand percussions, especially South American and African percussions. With the help of some Latin music cassettes and directions from Bonnie, he started playing congas and timbales. That process led him to more percussion instruments like Djembe, Udu and Darbuka.

First band 
In 2003, he met Tanvi Shah, who also shared similar musical interests with Siva. Together, they formed 'Zahrra', a band that performed popular music from all around the world. Soon, the band became famous in the Chennai music scene for performing South American, Cuban, African and Arabic music in the local stages. It also gave a huge recognition for Siva as a drummer and a percussionist and also gave him the tag 'Darbuka' because he was one of the few who played the Egyptian percussion instrument back then in the Chennai music scene. It all actually started with a DJ friend of Siva who printed the show's paraphernalia with the name 'Darbuka' Siva on it for the first time.

Yodhakaa 
In 2005, Siva formed 'Yodhakaa', which initially started off as an experimental band that primarily worked with Indian classical music with a contemporary approach. Yodhakaa's sound was ever evolving as a result of collaborations with various musicians. In 2010 Yodhakaa started working with ancient Indian Sanskrit texts, layering it with musical influences borrowed from all over the world. This experiment set up the sound that made Yodhakaa famous in the contemporary music scene. Purple Note, a record company that supported independent musicians in the country, signed Yodhakaa. The eponymous album came out in 2010, garnering rave reviews from the critics and the music fanatics for its sensible approach to contemporary Indian classical music.

La Pongal 
In 2010, Siva created La Pongal, a platform for contemporary folk music. La Pongal was born out of Siva's extensive research work on traditional Tamil folk musicians and their history behind the music. Siva visited villages of South Tamil Nadu to research and document Tamil folk music and the folk culture. This work paved way for the material that would later become a huge part of La Pongal's sound. Soon La Pongal became a well-known performing unit that featured traditional Tamil folk musicians collaborating with modern sounds. The band became a huge hit on the festival circuit for its tantalizing folk rhythms and blazing energy on stage. La Pongal released its first album in 2012 January on Pongal Day, which is an important harvest festival for Tamils. The band is actually named after this festival with a slight international tweak. The album features around 70 traditional folk musicians from various parts of the state belting it out with a bunch of contemporary musicians covering different styles of Tamil folk music. It was a first-of-its-kind album that was lapped up by the independent music lovers in India. La Pongal also went on with Anthony Daasan to feature in MTV Coke Studio India representing Tamil Folk music in the national stage alongside Usha Uthup.

La Pongal and Anthony Daasan were also featured in The Dewarists, a musical television series in India. The series is part music documentary and part travelogue. The show casts musicians from various parts of the world, collaborating to create original music while traveling across India. La Pongal collaborated with Shaa'ir and Func, an alternate electronic music duo from Mumbai.

OneBeat 
In September 2013, Siva was selected as an artist-in-residence for OneBeat – a US State Department project produced by Bang on a Can's Found Sound Nation. The project brings together 25 musicians from all over the world for a music residency in Atlantic Center for the Arts in Florida and an East coast tour of the US. This gave the much-needed international platform for Siva's Tamil folk music work. He toured all along the East Coast, from New Smyrna Beach to New York City performing and collaborating with international artists in prestigious venues and buzzing clubs.

The OneBeat experience made a lasting impression on Siva's artistic journey and opened up a completely new set of possibilities for him. Artistically, it inspired him to step into previously unexplored territories and completely altered his approach towards his art in the most positive way. He still continues to collaborate with the musicians from OneBeat working on Tamil folk music layered with influences from various cultures.

Darbuka Siva project 
Since 2015, Siva has been working on his latest project called 'Darbuka Siva bro'ject', a collection of various expressions that truly represent his current state-of-mind through sights, sounds and collaborations inspired by people, places and experiences all along. His most recent work being a project called 'Gala Gala'. This is a music video project that represents a bunch of extremely talented local boys playing football in and around North Madras, an area that has been the breeding ground for football in the city. Siva stumbled upon these boys during a documentary scout. Himself being a football fanatic and a hardcore supporter of the game, he is now working on raising funds for better footballing facilities for this group of
youngsters.

The Dosti Music Project 
In February 2016, Siva was picked as a facilitator/artist-in-residence for the Dosti Music Project which brings together a group of musicians from Pakistan, India, and the U.S. for a month-long residency and tour. The project invites a group of musicians from a wide variety of traditions to the U.S. to collaboratively write, record, and perform original music, reinvent traditional music, and develop initiatives that will make a positive impact on communities locally and internationally. Dosti, which means friendship in both Urdu and Hindi, seeks to transcend political and cultural barriers through cross-cultural musical collaboration.

Radio 
Siva joined Radio Mirchi in 2007 as an RJ and producer. This is where Siva was unofficially crowned with the on-air name 'Darbuka' Siva to differentiate himself from the other Shiva, who was also a radio jockey then alongside. Darbuka Siva became a household name among the radio faithful for his funny lines, absurd topics of discussions and non-stop
nonsense throughout his shows. On the other hand, he was also equally known for his sensible music-based shows, especially 'Naatupura Beat', which was a research show about Tamil folk music forms and musicians. The show featured traditional Tamil folk musicians from all over Tamil Nadu performing and discussing music and their lives on a two-hour long show.

In 2014, Siva returned to Radio for a short stint where he played a delusional news reporter called 'Nuisance Ganesh' for Radio City. The character became famous for covering the most unnecessary events in the history of journalism and reporting them in the most absurd fashion that someone can possibly do.

Television 
In 2012, Siva started working on a Television series that he conceptualized – a music travelogue show filmed in some of the most musically rich places of India like Rajasthan and Goa. The project was commissioned and telecast by the Tamil channel Pudhu Yugam. The show featured folk musicians from remote parts of Rajasthan on the first series followed by a complete dig at the music scene of Goa on the second series.

Film

Acting 
In 2015, Darbuka Siva made his debut as an actor in the heist action-thriller Rajathandhiram, where he played the character of Austin D'Costa, a small-time crook who finds himself in trouble in the midst of a job that has gone haywire along with his partners in crime. Filming was completed in 2014 December. The film opened worldwide on 13 March 2015 with rave reviews from the press and the online communities. Baradwaj Rangan, a noted film critic wrote: "Darbuka Siva, walks off with the film in his pocket. He has a great face for the movies (he may remind you of Dominique Pinon), and at a time comedy has been reduced to tired one-liners, it's a pleasure to be reminded of wit and timing."

In 2022, Darbuka Siva made a cameo appearance in his directorial debut Mudhal Nee Mudivum Nee. He played the role of a cupid who appears to salvage the lives of a bunch of people going through difficult times.

Composer 
In August 2016, Siva released his first ever full-length album as a music director for a feature film titled Kidaari. The album received rave reviews for its organic sounds and the blend of Tamil folk music with contemporary sounds.

During late 2016 Siva started working with Gautham Menon on making songs for Enai Noki Paayum Thota. The first single of the film, 'Maruvaarthai' was released on New Year's Eve of 2016 with credits to a certain Mr.X as the music composer. The song was a hit as well as the Mr.X campaign itself. During September 2017, Gautham Menon confirmed that Darbuka Siva was the much talked about Mr. X. Following that, a couple of more singles from the film were also released. 'Visiri' being another song that was well received for its amalgamation of Indian music sensibilities with Irish folk music.

Siva scored music for his directorial debut Mudhal Nee Mudivum Nee. The album was released in 2021 with a lot of appreciation for the songs. But the music album became a massive hit once the film was released.

Director 
Siva made his directorial debut with the film Mudhal Nee Mudivum Nee (2022). The film was released on 21st of January 2022 on Zee 5 OTT platform. The film garnered a lot of attention and appreciation right from the release date and went on to become a major hit among all demographics. The film also broke some box office record for the platform with the first ten days of release. The music of the film was also much celebrated with around 50K reels on Instagram within the first twenty days of release.

Performances 
 2007 Chennai Sangamam, Chennai, India/ Folk music festival
 2007 Kala Utsavam, Singapore/ Festival of Indian arts
 2008 MTV music awards, Bombay, India
 2008 Namaste India Festival, Tokyo, Japan
 2008 Roots Festival, Tour of North East, India
 2008 Sori Arts Festival, Jeonju, South Korea
 2008 The Shanghai Spring International Festival, Shanghai, China
 2008 Vladivostok Philharmonic Hall, Vladivostok, Russia
 2009 Lovebox Festival, London, UK
 2009 WOMAD, Charlton Park, UK
 2010 Commonwealth Games, Indian arts festival, Delhi, India
 2010 Kalaa Utsavam, Singapore/ Festival of Indian arts
 2010 SAARC bands festival, Delhi, India
 2011 Chennai Sangamam, Chennai, India/ Folk music festival
 2012 Coke Studio India, Bombay, India/ Television show
 2012 Pudhu Yugam, Goa, India/ Music documentary for television
 2012 Pudhu Yugam, Rajasthan, India/ Music documentary for television
 2012 The Dewarists, Chennai, India/ Television series
 2013 NH7 Weekender music festival, Bangalore, India
 2013 OneBeat tour, East coast of US
 2014 Celtic Connections, Glasgow, Scotland
 2016 Bessie Smith Cultural Center Chattanooga, US
 2016 Stopover Festival, Savannah, US

Filmography

As actor

As composer

As Director

Awards
 2012: TEDx Chennai Star, India (Award for achievements in local independent music)
 2012: Ink Fellows Program, Pune, India (Fellowship)
 2013: OneBeat, Florida, USA (Artist-in-residence)
 2016: Dosti Music Project, U.S.A (Facilitator/Artist-in-residence)

References

Further reading 

 Darbuka Siva is the composer of ENPT
 Found Sound Nation
 The Hindu, Yodhakaa Spotlight.
 "Old Sanskrit in new bottle" The Hindu
 "November Fest 2010 in Hyderabad" The Hindu
 "Yodhakaa making waves" The Hindu
 "Siva's new album release" The Times of India
 "A pleasant shower of music and folk arts in Coimbatore" The Hindu
 "Music, arts & dance fests to kick off in Coimbatore" The Times of India
 "Ooty rocks as pop and folk artists make music" The Times of India
 "Headbanging to Tamil beats" The Times of India
 "Chennai Band La Pongal Is A Hit at M.A.D."
 La Pongal The Indian Express
 "Durham musician promotes Art + Activism Festival featuring OneBeat" News & Observer
 "Musician Darbuka Shiva makes his debut as an actor" The Times of India 
 "Fox Star Studios bags Rajathandiram's distribution rights" Hindustan Times

External links 
 
 

1982 births
Living people
Musicians from Chennai
Tamil musicians
Indian male film score composers